Valentín Parera (15 July 1895, Granada – 5 April 1986, Madrid) was a Spanish actor who appeared in both silent and sound films in the 1920s and 1930s. He was married to the American singer and actress Grace Moore from 1931 until her death in a 1947 plane crash.

Filmography

Parera acted in European films such as

 Restless Hearts (Germany, 1928)
 Wine Cellars (France/Spain, 1930)

Subsequently, Parera appeared in several Spanish-language films made in the United States by Fox Film Corporation, including:

Yo, tú y ella (1933)
 Dos más uno dos (1934)
Granaderos del amor (1934)
 Señora casada necesita marido (1935)

References

External links 

1895 births
1986 deaths
Spanish male film actors
Spanish male silent film actors
20th-century Spanish male actors
People from Granada